George Jack Adam Legg (born 30 April 1996) is an English footballer who currently has no club.

Career
Legg began his career in the academy at Reading, where he had loan spells at Holyport, Oxford United, Hendon, Dunstable Town, Chesham United, Hampton & Richmond Borough, Gosport Borough and Hungerford Town, from whom he was recalled from a season-long loan to appear on the bench in two Championship matches. Legg featured for Reading's development team in the EFL Trophy in the 2017–18 season before joining Barnet on loan on 31 January 2018. He made his English Football League debut against Colchester United on 24 February 2018.

On 7 September 2018, Legg joined Aldershot Town on a month long loan, where he made 2 appearances in the Vanarama Conference. He then returned to Reading and was on the bench for 2 Championship games.

On 16 November 2018, Legg joined Braintree Town on a month-long loan deal. On 18 January 2019, Legg joined Boreham Wood on loan until the end of the season.

He was released by Reading at the end of the 2018–19 season.

George signed with Thatcham Town F.C in 2020 and only made one appearance for the club before being released.

Career statistics

Club

References

External links

1996 births
Living people
sportspeople from Reading, Berkshire
English footballers
Association football goalkeepers
Reading F.C. players
Oxford United F.C. players
Hendon F.C. players
Dunstable Town F.C. players
Chesham United F.C. players
Hampton & Richmond Borough F.C. players
Gosport Borough F.C. players
Hungerford Town F.C. players
Barnet F.C. players
Aldershot Town F.C. players
Braintree Town F.C. players
Boreham Wood F.C. players
English Football League players
National League (English football) players
Isthmian League players
Southern Football League players